

The Wessex Gospels (also known as the West-Saxon Gospels) refer to a translation of the four gospels of the Christian Bible into a West Saxon dialect of Old English. Produced from approximately AD 990 to 1175 in present-day England, this version is the first translation of all four gospels into stand-alone Old English text. Seven manuscript copies survive.  Its transcribing was supervised by the monk Aelfric of Eynsham.

Fæder ure þu þe eart on heofonum, si þin nama gehalgod. To becume þin rice, gewurþe ðin willa, on eorðan swa swa on heofonum.  Urne gedæghwamlican hlaf syle us todæg, and forgyf us ure gyltas, swa swa we forgyfað urum gyltendum.  And ne gelæd þu us on costnunge, ac alys us of yfele. Soþlice.

See also
Old English Hexateuch

References

Further reading
Geoffrey W. Bromiley (ed.), International Standard Bible Encyclopedia

External links
The Anglo-Saxon Version of the Holy Gospels at archive.org
The Holy Gospels in Anglo-Saxon, Northumbrian, and Old Mercian Versions (St Matthew) at archive.org
 The Holy Gospels in Anglo-Saxon, Northumbrian, and Old Mercian Versions (St Mark) at archive.org
The Holy Gospels in Anglo-Saxon, Northumbrian, and Old Mercian Versions (St Luke) at archive.org

Bible translations into English
Old English literature
10th-century books
Wessex